Ami Canaan Mann is a British-born American film director, television director and television writer.

Career
Mann has worked as a television and film writer since writing the NYPD Blue episode "Tea and Sympathy" in 2000. She has won three awards, all in 2001 for her first film as a director, Morning. These included the Audience Award at Dahlonega International Film Festival, Grand Prize for best directorial debut and Gold Award for Independent Theatrical Feature Films – First Feature. Her 2011 film, Texas Killing Fields, screened in competition at the 68th Venice International Film Festival in September. Jackie & Ryan, her romance film starring Katherine Heigl and Ben Barnes, screened in the Horizons section at the 71st Venice International Film Festival.

Personal life
Mann is the daughter of director Michael Mann.

Filmography

Films

Television

References

External links

Writers from London
American film directors
Jewish American writers
American people of Russian-Jewish descent
American television writers
American television directors
American women film directors
American women television directors
Living people
Place of birth missing (living people)
American women television writers
English-language film directors
Film directors from London
1969 births
21st-century American Jews
21st-century American women